Just My Luck is a 2006 American romantic comedy film directed by Donald Petrie, from a screenplay by I. Marlene King and Amy B. Harris, starring Lindsay Lohan, Chris Pine, Faizon Love, Missi Pyle, and McFly. It tells the story of Ashley Albright who works in public relations and is the luckiest person in Manhattan, while Jake Hardin is a janitor and would-be music producer who seems to have terrible luck until their good and bad luck is switched upon kissing each other at a masquerade party which changes both their lives and leads them to meet each other once again.

Plot

Ashley Albright works at Braden & Co. Public Relations and has an extremely fortunate life, experiencing recurring strokes of good fortune since childhood. In contrast, Jake Hardin experiences bad luck on a daily basis.

Jake is the unpaid US manager of the British band McFly. For weeks, he tries to get their demo CD to record label owner Damon Philips, hoping to get them discovered and become a music producer.

Jake sneaks into a masquerade ball put on by Ashley where he hopes to meet Phillips. During the ball, a fortune teller tells Ashley her luck will change. Failing to get Phillips' attention, Jake asks Ashley to dance. They kiss, switching their luck in the process.

Outside, Jake saves Phillips from being hit by a car. To repay him for saving his life, he takes the McFly demo and invites the band to his studio. Meanwhile, Ashley and Peggy are arrested because the neighbor she invited to be Peggy's date is a prostitute. Ashley is fired by Peggy and spends a night in jail.

The next day, Ashley learns her apartment is condemned due to a flood and mold. Staying with her friends Dana and Maggie she experiences more bad luck. She tracks down the fortune teller, who suggests someone needed her luck more. Ashley realizes the stranger she kissed has her luck.

Phillips is impressed with McFly and signs them. Ashley tracks down every male dancer hired to work the ball, kissing each of them. After this fails to restore her luck, hungry and overwhelmed, Ashley has a public breakdown at a diner where Jake is. Not recognizing her, he sympathizes with her frustration at constant bad luck, offering to find her a job. She takes his former job at the bowling alley, developing a friendship with him. When Jake is worried McFly doesn't have enough material for an upcoming gig at the Hard Rock Cafe, she introduces him to singer/songwriter Maggie. Impressed, he decides to use her song.

During a recording session, Ashley overhears Jake say he's been lucky ever since the masquerade ball. Realizing he was the masked dancer, she kisses him and leaves, finding her luck is back. She runs into Peggy, who is now engaged to Antonio and offers to rehire Ashley as the Vice President of Braden & Co. if she helps with a meeting that very night. Ashley then learns Maggie's song will no longer be performed at the concert.

Looking at a mirror she broke earlier, Ashley reflects on the cost of her good luck. Deciding to forego Peggy's rehiring offer, she goes to the concert where Jake and the band are having bad luck and may have to cancel the concert. Ashley kisses Jake and circumstances change, leading to a successful concert where Maggie's song is performed. Ashley realizes she's in love with Jake but doesn't wish to give him bad luck again. She decides to leave and live with her parents for a while.

Jake finds Ashley at Grand Central, realizing she is the woman from the ball. Since he used good luck to help others, Ashley argues she doesn't want to take it away. He points out she experienced good things even with bad luck and says he is willing to experience bad luck again if they are together. They kiss, switching their good and bad luck back and forth. Katy arrives and they simultaneously kiss her on each cheek, causing another luck transfer. She then wins a $25 lottery ticket. Jake and Ashley walk hand-in-hand, wondering if they will get used to living without luck and debating karma. Outside a construction crew accidentally break a pipe and water rains down on the two just as the movie ends.

Cast
 Lindsay Lohan as Ashley Albright 
 Chris Pine as Jake Hardin
 McFly as themselves
 Faizon Love as Damon Phillips
 Samaire Armstrong as Maggie Smith
 Bree Turner as Dana Adams
 Missi Pyle as Peggy Braden
 Makenzie Vega as Katy Hardin
 Tovah Feldshuh as Madame Z
 Jaqueline Fleming as Tiffany Richards
 Chris Carmack as David Pennington
 Carlos Ponce as Antonio Cordova
 Dane Rhodes as Mac
 J.C. Sealy as Aunt Marta Hardin

Production

Filming
Principal photography of interior scenes (such as Ashley's apartment and Jake's apartment) took place in New Orleans, Louisiana before Hurricane Katrina hit the area. In March 2005, exterior scenes were shot in New York City. NYC locations included: the apartment building 43 Fifth Avenue (originally constructed in 1905 by architect Henry Andersen), which has been the home to many celebrities including actresses Julia Roberts and Holly Hunter, novelist Dawn Powell, and screenwriter Noah Baumbach; Christopher Park in Greenwich Village (where Jake offers Ashley a job); the New York Palace Hotel (455 Madison Avenue, where the masquerade ball takes place); Central Park; Rivera Cafe (225 West 4th Street, where Ashley experiences a public outburst); and the Hard Rock Cafe in Times Square, where McFly's concert is supposed to take place. Filming also involved exterior and interior shooting at Grand Central Terminal for the movie's final scene.

During filming, Lohan sprained her ankle, making it difficult to walk for a time and preventing her from wearing heels.

Reception
The film received mostly negative reviews from critics, with Rotten Tomatoes giving it a 14% rating based on 111 reviews with the critics' consensus: "Just My Luck asks little of its leads and less of its audience, adding up to a middling teen rom-com that sorely lacks sparks." Audiences polled by CinemaScore gave the film an average grade "B" on an A+ to F scale.

Lohan earned a Razzie Award nomination as Worst Actress for her performance in the film.

Box office
Just My Luck opened at #4 at the North American box office with $5,692,285 in its opening weekend, May 12, 2006. In the US, it grossed $17,326,650. The film grossed $38 million worldwide.

Soundtrack

The album is made up partly of songs from McFly's first two albums, Room on the 3rd Floor and Wonderland, with the exception of the brand new track "Just My Luck", which was recorded especially for the film. Though released as the film's soundtrack, a selection of the songs featured on the album were not in the film. Reworked versions of "5 Colours in Her Hair", "I've Got You" and "Unsaid Things", as well as the censored Single version of "I Wanna Hold You" appear on the album instead of the original versions. The European version of the album slightly muddles up the track listing, and adds the hidden track "Get Over You" in the pre-gap.

Track listing

References

External links
 
 
 
 

2000s American films
2006 films
2006 fantasy films
2006 romantic comedy films
2000s English-language films
2000s fantasy comedy films
2000s romantic fantasy films
20th Century Fox films
American fantasy comedy films
American romantic comedy films
American romantic fantasy films
Films about musical groups
Films directed by Donald Petrie
Films scored by Teddy Castellucci
Films set in New York City
Films shot in Los Angeles
Films shot in New Orleans
Films shot in New York City
Regency Enterprises films
Films produced by Arnon Milchan